The 2002 UNCAF Interclub Cup was the fourth edition of the UNCAF Club Tournament, under the name UNCAF Interclub Cup and the 20th overall; Liga Deportiva Alajuelense from Costa Rica were declared champions for the second time in its history after winning the Final stage, as C.D. Árabe Unido from Panamá and C.D. Motagua from Honduras joined them to the 2003 CONCACAF Champions' Cup.

Participating teams

  Alajuelense
  Santos de Guápiles
  Alianza
  FAS
  Comunicaciones
  Municipal
  Marathón
  Motagua
  Jalapa
  San Marcos
  Árabe Unido
  Tauro

First stage

Group A

Group B

Group C

Final stage

References

External links
 UNCAF
 RSSSF

UNCAF Interclub Cup
1
2002–03 in Honduran football
2002–03 in Guatemalan football
2002–03 in Costa Rican football
2002–03 in Salvadoran football
2002–03 in Nicaraguan football
2002–03 in Panamanian football